The 78th Pennsylvania Volunteer Infantry was an infantry regiment that served in the Union Army during the American Civil War.

Service
The 78th Pennsylvania Infantry was organized at Pittsburgh, Pennsylvania and mustered in for a three-year enlistment on October 12, 1861, under the command of Colonel William Sirwell.

The regiment was attached to Negley's 4th Brigade, McCook's Division, at Nolin, to November 1861. 7th Brigade, Army of the Ohio, to December 1861. 7th Brigade, 2nd Division, Army of the Ohio, to March 1862.  Negley's Independent Brigade, Army of the Ohio, to August 1862. 7th Brigade, 8th Division, Army of the Ohio, to November 1862. 3rd Brigade, 2nd Division, Centre, Army of the Cumberland, to January 1863. 3rd Brigade, 2nd Division, XIV Corps, Army of the Cumberland, to October 1863. 3rd Brigade, 1st Division, XIV Corps, to July 1864. Unassigned, 4th Division, XX Corps, Department of the Cumberland, to October 1864. Garrison duty at Nashville, Tenn., to September 1865.

The 78th Pennsylvania Infantry mustered out of service on September 11, 1865.

Casualties
The regiment lost a total of 267 men during service; 2 officers and 68 enlisted men killed or mortally wounded, 3 officers and 194 enlisted men died of disease.

Commanders
 Colonel William Sirwell
 Lieutenant Colonel Archibald Blakeley - commanded at the battle of Chickamauga
 Major Henry W. Torbett - commanded at the battle of Nashville

See also

 List of Pennsylvania Civil War Units
 Pennsylvania in the Civil War

References
 Dyer, Frederick H. A Compendium of the War of the Rebellion (Des Moines, IA:  Dyer Pub. Co.), 1908.
 Gancas, Ron. The Gallant Seventy Eighth, Stones River to Pickett's Mill: Colonel William Sirwell and the Pennsylvania Seventy Eighth Volunteer Infantry (Murrysville, PA: R. Gancas), 1994.  
 Gancas, Ron and Dan Coyle. Dear Teres: The Civil War Letters of Andrew Joseph Duff and Dennis Dugan of Company F, the Pennsylvania Seventy-Eighth Infantry (Butler, PA:  Mechling Associates), 1999.  
 Gibson, Joseph Thompson. History of the Seventy-Eighth Pennsylvania Volunteer Infantry (Pittsburgh, PA:  Press of the Pittsburgh Print. Co.), 1905.
 Lutzke, Mitch. The Life and Times of Kimber M. Snyder: A Soldier in the 78th Pennsylvania Volunteer Infantry (Bloomington, IN:  AuthorHouse), 2006.  
Attribution

External links
 Company F, 78th Pennsylvania Infantry living history organization

Military units and formations established in 1861
Military units and formations disestablished in 1865
Units and formations of the Union Army from Pennsylvania
1861 establishments in Pennsylvania